Velukkakka Oppu Ka is a 2021 Malayalam language movie starring Indrans in the lead role. The movie was released on 6 July 2021 through the OTT platforms BookMyShow Stream, first shows and zeestreams. The movie is also the directional debut of Ashok R. Kalitha.

Cast
 Indrans as Velukkakka
 M R Madhu Babu
 Naseer Sankranthi
 Saju Navodaya

References

2021 films
2020s Malayalam-language films
Films not released in theaters due to the COVID-19 pandemic